Houna is a town in the Kouka Department of Banwa Province in western Burkina Faso. As of 2005 it had a population of 3,483.

References

Populated places in the Boucle du Mouhoun Region
Banwa Province